Deliathis is a genus of longhorn beetles of the subfamily Lamiinae, containing the following species:

 Deliathis batesi Gahan, 1888
 Deliathis bifurcata Dillon & Dillon, 1941
 Deliathis buqueti (Tasté, 1841)
 Deliathis diluta Gahan, 1892
 Deliathis flavis Dillon & Dillon, 1941
 Deliathis imperator (Thomson, 1868)
 Deliathis impluviata (Lacordaire, 1869)
 Deliathis incana (Forster, 1771)
 Deliathis neonivea Santos-Silva & Botero, 2018
 Deliathis nigrovittata Breuning, 1980
 Deliathis nivea Bates, 1869
 Deliathis parincana Breuning, 1971
 Deliathis pulchra Thomson, 1865
 Deliathis quadritaeniator (White, 1846)
 Deliathis superba Franz, 1954

References

Lamiini